Several Canadian naval units have been named HMCS Vancouver. One was named for the explorer George Vancouver, the others after the city of Vancouver.

Named for George Vancouver;

The ship was decommissioned and scrapped in 1937.

Named for the city of Vancouver;

HMCS Vancouver (K225) (II) was a  that was renamed  before her launch in November 1941.
 (III) was a Flower-class corvette that served in the Second World War. Vancouver served from its commission in March 1942 to the end of the war, when it was taken out of service in June 1945.
HMCS Vancouver (IV) was a survey ship launched in June 1965 and sold in 1982.
 (V) is a  serving in the Canadian Forces since 1993.

Battle honours
Aleutians, 1942-43.
Atlantic, 1944–45
Arabian Sea

See also

References
Citations

References

 Johnston, William; Rawling, William G.P; Gimblett, Richard; and MacFarlane, John. (2010) The Seabound Coast: The Official History of the Royal Canadian Navy, 1867-1939. Volume 1; Toronto: Dundurn Press. 

Ships of the Royal Canadian Navy
Royal Canadian Navy ship names